Andres Gandarias (24 April 1943 – 27 May 2018) was a Spanish professional road bicycle racer. He finished in the top 10 of the Tour de France twice.

Palmarès 

1968
Tour de France:
9th place overall classification
1969
Basauri
Tour de France:
5th place overall classification

References

External links 

Official Tour de France results for Andres Gandarias

1943 births
2018 deaths
Spanish male cyclists
People from Busturialdea
Sportspeople from Biscay
Cyclists from the Basque Country (autonomous community)